The Roman Catholic Archdiocese of Lingayen–Dagupan is an archdiocese of the Roman Catholic Church in the Province of Pangasinan, Philippines.  Its cathedral is the Metropolitan Cathedral of St. John the Evangelist in Dagupan with a co-cathedral, the Epiphany of Our Lord Parish Church, in the neighboring municipality of Lingayen.

Its suffragan dioceses of San Jose and Cabanatuan in Nueva Ecija, along with the dioceses of Malolos in Bulacan (suffragan of Archdiocese of Manila), and Balanga (Bataan), Iba (Zambales) and Tarlac (Tarlac; suffragans of the Archdiocese of San Fernando), form the group of dioceses in Central Luzon.

History
The Diocese of Lingayen was created on May 19, 1928, comprising the entire province of Pangasinan. In 1954, because of the destruction brought on Lingayen by World War II, the see was transferred to Dagupan, and the diocese was named as the Diocese of Lingayen-Dagupan. The diocese was elevated to an archdiocese in 1963.

Coat of Arms
The nimbed silver eagle is the symbol of Saint John the Apostle and Evangelist, the titular of the cathedral at Dagupan. The silver star (previously depicted as three gold Oriental crowns) refers to the Epiphany of the Lord, the titular of the co-cathedral at Lingayen. The red wavy pile represents Lingayen Gulf. The green field represents the "rice-bowl" of the Philippines, the whole of Pangasinan and Nueva Ecija. The three heraldic roses represent our Lady, the Mystical Rose, who is venerated in the archdiocese under three titles: Our Lady of the Most Holy Rosary of Manaoag; Our Lady of Purification; and Mary Help of Christians.

Timeline of bishops

Ordinaries

Auxiliary Bishops

Bishops

Ordinaries

Auxiliary Bishops

Affiliated Bishops 
Jesus Juan Acosta Sison, appointed Bishop of Tarlac in 1963
 Enrique de Vera Macaraeg, appointed Bishop of Tarlac in 2016

Suffragan dioceses
The archdiocese has five suffragan dioceses:
Diocese of Alaminos
Diocese of Cabanatuan
Diocese of San Fernando de La Union
Diocese of San Jose de Nueva Ecija
Diocese of Urdaneta

See also
Roman Catholicism in the Philippines
List of Catholic dioceses in the Philippines

References

External links
Official website

Roman Catholic dioceses in the Philippines
Archdiocese
Christian organizations established in 1928
Roman Catholic dioceses and prelatures established in the 20th century
Religion in Pangasinan
Dagupan